Brenden Pappas (born 7 May 1970) is a professional golfer from South Africa who currently plays on the Web.com Tour.

Early life
Pappas was born in Phalaborwa, South Africa. He is the youngest of four brothers, Craigen Pappas (born 1959), Sean (born 1966) and Deane (born 1967). He and Deane attended the University of Arkansas where he graduated in 1993 with a Bachelor's degree in Retail Marketing.

Professional career
Pappas turned professional in 1993 and played on Southern Africa Tour until 2000, when he joined the Nationwide Tour. In his 2000 rookie year. He made 5 of 12 cuts and a little over $17,000. His 2001 season included over $188,000 in earnings and 6 top-10s, which included two runner-up finishes.

2002 was Pappas' rookie year on the PGA Tour. He made 6 of 25 cuts and made $83,000. He played well on the PGA Tour a year later in 2003. He made over $1.3 million with 5 top-10s and his career high finish of 2nd at the Southern Farm Bureau Classic. In 2004, Pappas made 13 of 34 cuts and $524,000, outside the top 125 on the money list, meaning conditional status on the Tour for 2005.

Pappas played between the PGA and Nationwide Tours in 2005, making less than $300,000 for the two tours combined. He would play full-time on the Nationwide Tour for the 2006 season.

In 2006, Pappas picked up his first win in the United States with a win at the Rex Hospital Open in June 2006. Even with the win, he did not earn enough to get back onto the PGA Tour.

Pappas and his brother Dean would become the first brothers to graduate from the Nationwide Tour simultaneously in 2001, with Brenden earning over $180,000 with 6 top-10s.

His 2008 PGA Tour season included 9 made cuts in 24 events, $384,000 and a finish outside the top 150 on the money list.

He has been playing back full-time on the Nationwide Tour since the beginning of 2009, earning an unofficial win in Colombia in 2011; the win is considered unofficial because only 36 holes were played.

Professional wins (3)

Sunshine Tour wins (1)

Nationwide Tour wins (1)

Other wins (1)

*Note: The 2011 Pacific Rubiales Bogotá Open was shortened to 36 holes due to rain. Due to the event's length, this win is not officially recognised as a Nationwide Tour victory.

Results in major championships

CUT = missed the half-way cut
Note: Pappas only played in the PGA Championship.

See also
2001 Buy.com Tour graduates
2002 PGA Tour Qualifying School graduates
2007 Nationwide Tour graduates
2009 PGA Tour Qualifying School graduates

References

External links

South African male golfers
Greek male golfers
Arkansas Razorbacks men's golfers
Sunshine Tour golfers
PGA Tour golfers
Korn Ferry Tour graduates
Mediterranean Games medalists in golf
Mediterranean Games bronze medalists for Greece
Competitors at the 1993 Mediterranean Games
Golfers from Texas
People from Phalaborwa
Sportspeople from Limpopo
People from McKinney, Texas
1970 births
Living people